DWBC (87.9 FM), broadcasting as 87.9 Radyo Biñan, is a low-power radio station owned and operated by the Biñan city government. Its studio and transmitter are located at the City Hall, Brgy. Zapote, Biñan.

References

Radio stations in Laguna (province)
Radio stations established in 2018